Pleurotomella granuliapicata is a species of sea snail, a marine gastropod mollusk in the family Raphitomidae.

Description

Distribution
This marine species occurs off Japan.

References

External links
 

granuliapicata
Gastropods described in 1964